Electoral results for the Division of Angas  may refer to:

 Electoral results for the Division of Angas (1903–34)
 Electoral results for the Division of Angas (1949–77)